RSDL may refer to:

 RESTful Service Description Language, an XML description of HTTP-based web applications
 Rotating Staircase Deadline, a Linux CPU scheduler
 Rail Simulator Developments Ltd, a developer of Rail Simulator
 Reactive skin decontamination lotion; See Dry decontamination
 Reverse spiral dual layer, a DVD format; For example See Intimate and Live
 Residential Surveillance at a Designated Location, a form of detention in the People's Republic of China
 Russian Social Democratic Labour Party